The Hajee Meera Academy is an educational institution located in Esanatham, India. It is located at a distance of 45 km from Dindigul. This is the first and only-established Matriculation school in the village which is recognized by Tamil Nadu government. The school attempts to provide a well-rounded education to students by allocating liberal time and resources for arts, crafts and games.

Facilities 
 Visual class
 Library
 Play Ground

Celebrations
Kamaraj birthday
Vegetables Day 
Independence Day
Teacher's Day
Children's Day
Diwali and Ramzan celebrations
Science Adventures ( Inter School Science Exhibition)
Pongal celebrations
Republic Day celebrations 
Sports Day
Annual Day

The four houses of the school are:
Amazing Gladiators
Striking Thunders
Rising Warriors
Blazing Stars

References

Schools in Tamil Nadu
Karur district